Platycholeus is a genus of small carrion beetles in the family Leiodidae. There are at least two described species in Platycholeus.

Species
These two species belong to the genus Platycholeus:
 Platycholeus leptinoides (Crotch, 1874)
 Platycholeus opacellus (Fall, 1909)

References

Further reading

 
 
 

Leiodidae
Articles created by Qbugbot